The World Group was the highest level of Davis Cup competition in 1993. The first-round losers went into the Davis Cup World Group Qualifying Round, and the winners progressed to the quarterfinals and were guaranteed a World Group spot for 1994.

The United States were the defending champions, but were eliminated in the first round.

Germany won the title, defeating Australia in the final, 4–1. The final was held at the Messe Düsseldorf Exhibition Hall in Düsseldorf, Germany, from 3 to 5 December. It was the German team's 3rd Davis Cup title overall.

Participating teams

Draw

First round

Australia vs. United States

Italy vs. Brazil

Austria vs. France

India vs. Switzerland

Spain vs. Netherlands

Sweden vs. Cuba

Denmark vs. Czech Republic

Russia vs. Germany

Quarterfinals

Italy vs. Australia

France vs. India

Netherlands vs. Sweden

Germany vs. Czech Republic

Semifinals

India vs. Australia

Sweden vs. Germany

Final

Germany vs. Australia

Notes

References

External links
Davis Cup official website

World Group
Davis Cup World Group
Davis Cup